Givat Oranim is a neighborhood in southwestern Jerusalem, bordered by Katamon, Rassco, San Simon and Kiryat Shmuel.

Givat Oranim was established after 1948. The area played an important part in the battle for the San Simon monastery during 1948 Palestine war. It is populated by a mix of national religious and secular Jews. Large-scale building in 1991 included a project of 78 housing units combining high rise buildings and townhouses.     

In this neighborhood there was an attempt to assassinate the left-wing activist, Zeev Sternhell, by putting a bomb on his apartment door.

Notable residents
Zeev Sternhell

References

 

Neighbourhoods of Jerusalem